The Puelo River has its origin in Lake Puelo in Argentine, and flows north-west through 
the Andes into Chile and the Reloncaví Estuary of the Reloncaví Sound at the northern end of the Gulf of Ancud.

Course
After leaving the lake, the river flows in a generally northwesterly direction, receiving the waters of a chain of lakes, the largest being Azul and Las Rocas. It also receives the waters of Ventisquero and Traidor rivers. A part of the northernmost border of Pumalín Park approximately parallels the course of the Ventisquero River. Traidor River rises in Hornopirén National Park.

A large northern tributary of the Puelo, the Manso, has its sources in Mascardi Lake and other lakes and streams south-east of the Cerro Tronador, also in Argentina, and flows south-west through the Andes to unite with the Puelo a few kilometers west of the 72nd meridian. Puelo river's lower course is impeded in such a manner as to form three small lakes, called Superior, Inferior and the Tagua Tagua Lake.

References

Puelo River
Puelo River
Rivers of Los Lagos Region
Rivers of Chubut Province
International rivers of South America